The Turks and Caicos Islands competed in the 2011 Commonwealth Youth Games held in the British Crown Dependency of Isle of Man from 7 to 13 September 2011. Their participation marked their second Commonwealth Youth Games appearance. The Caribbean British Overseas Territory sent a delegation that consisted of three competitors (one man and two women) participating in the athletics—one out of seven sports of the Games—events only. This was a decrease in the number of athletes from the nation's last appearance at the Games, when eight athletes were sent to the 2008 Commonwealth Youth Games in Pune. Ifeany Otounye won the sole medal of the Turks and Caicos Islands in the Games, a bronze in long jump with a best jump of 7.15 m, setting a new national record in the event. Otounye improved the national record by 5 centimeters, the previous one was 7.10 m, set by Levard Missick 13 years ago during the 1998 Commonwealth Games in Kuala Lumpur, Malaysia. Turks and Caicos Islands ranked last—at 22nd spot—in the medal table of the Games, the position shared by nine other Commonwealth Games Associations.

Delegation
Turks and Caicos Islands Commonwealth Games Association selected three athletes – one man and two women – to represent the nation in the 2011 Commonwealth Youth Games; all contingents participated in the athletics events only. Ifeany Otounye competed in the 200 m and long jump events. Serena Delancy and Dixie Smith participated in 200 m; Smith also competed in 400 m, while Delancy represented her nation in the long jump.

Athletics

Men

Women

References

Nations at the 2011 Commonwealth Youth Games
2011 in the Turks and Caicos Islands